The Association of Language Testers in Europe (ALTE) is an association of language exam providers in Europe.

The ALTE "Can Do" project developed a simplified set of 400+ descriptors for language examinations which relate to the Common Reference Levels. These descriptors are in the form of "can-do statements", each saying more simply what a learner can do at every level. There are four sections: general, social/ tourist, work and study. The ALTE project also gave its own names to the CEFR levels from the "Breakthrough level" to "Level 5".

The ALTE was founded by the University of Cambridge in conjunction with the University of Salamanca so the first exams to be related to their "Can-Do" statements were the Cambridge EFL exams. However, today many more examining boards link their exams to the system. Below is a table of some examinations as an example.

ALTE now establishes a six-level framework of language examination standards.

The following table compares the ALTE levels with the CEFR levels and EFL exams:

Levels

The Common European Framework divides learners into three broad divisions which can be divided into six levels:

 A Basic User
 A1 Breakthrough
 A2 Waystage
 B Independent User
 B1 Threshold
 B2 Vantage
 C Proficient User
 C1 Effective Operational Proficiency
 C2 Mastery

The CEFR describes what a learner is supposed to be able to do in reading, listening, speaking and writing at each level, in details:

Conferences

ALTE aims to improve language assessment through sharing best practice and providing thought leadership through international conferences.

International conference themes have included supporting the European Year of Languages (2001), the impact of multilingualism (2005), the wider social and educational impact of assessment (2008) and the role of language frameworks (2011). Selected conference papers are published through the Studies in Language Testing (SiLT) volumes.

See also 

 Common European Framework of Reference for Languages
 Cambridge English Language Assessment
 Studies in Language Testing (SiLT)

References

External links 
 The ALTE home page

Language tests